Howard Center is a Burlington, Vermont-based nonprofit organization that offers professional crisis and counseling services to children and adults; supportive services to individuals with autism and developmental disabilities who need help with education, employment, and life maintenance skills; counseling and medical services for those struggling with substance use disorders; and interventions and supports for adults with serious and persistent mental health challenges in Chittenden County, Vermont's most populous county. Howard Center collaborates with many community partners and is a funded agency of the United Way of Northwest Vermont.

Services and supports are community-based and provided in more than 60 locations, including area schools, hospitals, emergency rooms, and client homes, in addition to Howard Center offices and residential homes. In 2018, Howard Center's professional staff of 1,500 helped more than 16,000 people, primarily in Chittenden County, but also in the other Vermont counties of Franklin, Grand Isle, and Rutland.

History
Tracing its roots to the 1865 founding of the Home for Destitute Children, Howard Center is the largest of Vermont's designated agencies representing Vermont's mental health care system.

In 1966, the Howard Center for Human Services received its designation as the community mental health center for Chittenden County under the federal Community Mental Health Act of 1963.

In 1994, the Howard Center for Human Services merged with Champlain Drug and Alcohol Services and the Baird Center for Children and Families (a successor of the Home for Destitute Children) into one organization, forming today's Howard Center.

Crisis services

The organization maintains First Call for Chittenden County, a 24/7 crisis hotline for Chittenden County residents experiencing a non-medical crisis.

Specialized programs
The organization operates four specialized therapeutic schools:
 The Baird School, Burlington, provides an alternative educational environment for children ages 5–15 in grades K-8 whose needs can not be met in a regular educational environment due to social, emotional, and/or behavioral challenges.
 Jean Garvin School in Williston provides a therapeutic educational program offering unique learning opportunities to inspire personal change and well-being for adolescents, ages 12–8 in grades 7-12.
 Fay Honey Knopp Memorial School in the city of Rutland is a licensed school that provides a supportive and safe educational environment that offers educational, therapeutic, and transition services to residents of HowardCenter's Park Street Program for adolescent males with sexual harming behaviors.
  Howard Center is a partner with Matrix Health Systems and the Northeastern Family Institute of Vermont to operate the Centerpoint School Collaborative in South Burlington. 
 School Services: Howard Center's School Services Program helps children ages 3 to 22—and their families—who face a broad range of challenges that may impact learning and school behavior. A component of the program includes masters-level clinicians who work in nearly all of Chittenden County's 50+ schools where many of the services are provided. Services are also provided in home and community settings.
 Howard Center supports clients in recovery from substance use. 
When the Chittenden Clinic was established in 2002, it was the first medication assisted treatment clinic for opioid addiction in Vermont. From July 1, 2017 through June 30, 2018, the Clinic provided treatment and support to 1,342 individuals.
Safe Recovery serves people who are currently using cocaine, heroin, or who are in early recovery from opioid dependence. Services include syringe exchange, low-barrier distribution to buprenorphine, fentanyl test strips, drug treatment options counseling, HIV and hepatitis C testing and referrals, hepatitis A and B vaccination, distribution of Naloxone overdose rescue kits, corrections outreach, basic needs assistance, advocacy, and other recovery support services. All services are offered free of charge, and many can be accessed anonymously. From July 1, 2017 through June 30, 2018, 1,236 individuals visited Safe Recovery.
In December 2013, Safe Recovery began distributing Naloxone kits to reverse overdoses from opioids. Since then, 1,357 overdose reversals have been reported from the kits the program distributed.

Although the goal of all Howard Center programs is to help individuals and families live healthy lives as independently as possible, several programs provide specific support for individuals with intellectual disabilities including autism.

 Safety Connection program helps adults with intellectual disabilities or autism live independently in the community setting of their choice. The program assists youth in transition, single adults and families, and elders who wish to age in place. Safety Connection works with clients and their support teams which may include both Howard Center staff and community partners. Safety Connection team collaborates with all partners to build an individualized independent living program, combining home-based monitoring technologies with clinically trained staff monitors and responders.
 The SUCCEED program is a post-secondary education program for students with intellectual disabilities and autism, provided by Howard Center in collaboration with area colleges. The goal of SUCCEED is to provide students with a comprehensive college experience that prepares them for a future of success, creativity, and contribution to their community. Students have the opportunity to participate in four program areas: student housing, education, campus life, and career development. Students graduate with the ability to live in their own apartment, develop meaningful friendships, obtain fulfilling employment, and establish social connections within their community.

Clients served and community impact 
From July 1, 2017 – June 30, 2018, Howard Center provided support to 9,349 clients. Of those, 2,538 were new clients. 
 Crisis Services	2,757
 Outpatient Services	3,532
 Medication Assisted Treatment (MAT)	1,342
 Residential Services	774
 School Based Services	1,490
 Community Based Support	2,292
 Employment Programs	420

In addition, Howard Center annually provides support to thousands of individuals in the community who receive services (particularly through 24/7 crisis services) without officially enrolling as a client.

Several Howard Center programs offer treatment and support services that reduce the request for services from other city organizations and departments. For example, Howard Center's Street Outreach and Community Outreach Programs reduce reliance on the Police Department to respond to calls in the downtown area that are primarily the result of social service needs.

Awards
The Center has been recognized by the following organizations:
 The Greater Burlington YMCA recognized Howard Center with their annual award for the organization's continued service to clients and the impact of their work. (May 2015) 
 KidSafe Collaborative's Annual Outstanding Service Awards presented the Gregory Packan Esq. Award for Outstanding Children's Advocacy to a Howard Center School Social Worker.  (May 2015) 
 The National Committee for Quality Assurance (NCQA) recognized Howard Center's medication assisted treatment program as a Patient-Centered Specialty Practice, the first outpatient treatment program in the nation to gain this level of recognition. (March 2015) 
 Jackson Healthcare Hospital Charitable Services Program of Excellence Awards named Howard Center's Street Outreach Program as one of 10 programs nationwide to receive a $10,000 award.  
 National Council for Behavioral Health's 2014-2015 Addressing Health Disparities Leadership Program selected First Call Director as one of 25 participants nationwide to participate in the leadership program. (October 2014) 
 The Governor's Criminal Justice and Substance Abuse Cabinet appointed Howard Center's Chief Executive Officer to serve on the committee and a member of Howard Center's board of trustees to serve as chair. (September 2014)

Vermont System of Care Designation 
As a Designated Agency (DA) within Vermont's System of Care, Howard Center participates in an extensive re-designation process every three years, most recently in 2015. The System of Care establishes a geographic region for each DA to establish, provide, coordinate, and administer services and supports for people for whom it is designated to assure services. The review process ensures minimum standards are met to provide publicly funded supports and that administrative rules and outcomes are met.

Accreditation 
Howard Center's  Chittenden Clinic, which provide medication assisted treatment for individuals with opioid dependence, received a three-year accreditation in 2015 from CARF International (formerly known as the Commission of Accreditation of Rehabilitation Facilities). The clinic is affiliated with the University of Vermont Medical Center.

Affiliations and partnerships 
In addition to the programs and services offered by Howard Center, the agency collaborates with numerous community partners to expand the support it offers to individuals and communities. Key examples include:
 City of Burlington Police Department and the University of Vermont Medical Center: Street Outreach Program.
 Central Vermont Substance Abuse Services: CVSAS is the designated substance abuse service agency providing effective alcohol and other drug outpatient and intensive outpatient treatment services for the Greater Washington County area. CVSAS offers services for adults and adolescents and their families.
 Collaborative Solutions Corporation/Second Spring is a licensed, residential treatment facility helping its residents develop and implement personal recovery plans that will help them become independent.
 Howard Center is a funded agency of the United Way of Chittenden County.

Organization
The organization has a budget of $90 million. Over 90% of services are state-funded.

Nearly 80% of the organization's budget is allocated for workforce, for both regular and contracted employees.

In 2014, Vermont Business Magazine ranked Howard Center as the 11th largest employer in the state of Vermont by employee roster.

The president of Howard Center was Michael Simoneau as of 2018.

Footnotes

External links
 List of Howard Center programs

Companies based in Burlington, Vermont
1969 establishments in Vermont
Addiction organizations in the United States
Drug and alcohol rehabilitation centers
Mental health organizations in Vermont